Sehar is a Jat dominant village located in Loharu Tehsil of Bhiwani district in Haryana, India. It is situated 25 km away from sub-district headquarter Loharu and 60 km away from district headquarter Bhiwani. , Sehar is also a gram panchayat.

There are about 289 houses in Sehar village most of them are still owned by the Hindu Family . Loharu is nearest town to Sehar.  Pilani, Rajgarh Churu, Bhiwani, Mahendragarh are the cities near Sehar. This place is in the border of the Bhiwani District and Jhunjhunu District.

References

Villages in Bhiwani district